Pat Scanlon may refer to:
Pat Scanlon (outfielder) (1861–1913), American baseball outfielder
Pat Scanlon (third baseman) (born 1952), American baseball third baseman